Bethel Christian School is a private Pre-kindergarten - 12 Christian school located in Ruston, Louisiana. The school was founded in 1965 by Dr. Jack and Florine Martin.

As of 2012, Bethel had one hundred forty-six students, from one hundred four families. One hundred two students are white, twenty-one are black, three are Hispanic, and one is American Indian. Thirty-six are in pre-kindergarten and kindergarten, fifty-nine in grades 1–6, and thirty-four in grades 7–12.

References

External links

Bethel Christian School

1965 establishments in Louisiana
Christian schools in Louisiana
Educational institutions established in 1965
Private elementary schools in Louisiana
Private middle schools in Louisiana
Private high schools in Louisiana
Ruston, Louisiana
Schools in Lincoln Parish, Louisiana